Henry J. "Red" Krause, Jr. (August 28, 1913 – February 20, 1987) was an American football offensive lineman in the National Football League for the Brooklyn Dodgers and the Washington Redskins.  He played college football at St. Louis University.

References

1913 births
1987 deaths
American football offensive linemen
Saint Louis Billikens football coaches
Saint Louis Billikens football players
Brooklyn Dodgers (NFL) players
Washington Redskins players
Players of American football from St. Louis